Paul Dubrule (born 1934) is a French businessman and politician. He co-founded AccorHotels in 1967. He served as a member of the French Senate from 1999 to 2004, representing Seine-et-Marne. In 2002, he established the Ecole d'Hôtellerie et de Tourisme Paul Dubrule in Siem Reap, Cambodia. The Rue Paul Dubrule in Lesquin was named in his honor in 2016.

References

Living people
1934 births
People from Tourcoing
University of Geneva alumni
20th-century French businesspeople
21st-century French businesspeople
French company founders
French corporate directors
French Senators of the Fifth Republic
21st-century French philanthropists
Senators of Seine-et-Marne